Svetozar Ristovski (born January 26, 1972) is a Macedonian film director who now resides in Canada. His first film was the 2000 short Hunter about the psychological study of a wartime sniper. He marked his English language debut with 2010's Dear Mr. Gacy, about American serial killer John Wayne Gacy. In addition to the awards he won for Mirage, he also won the Golden Lily Award at GoEast for Joy of Life in 2002.

Filmography
 Lazar (2015)
 Dear Mr. Gacy (2010)
 Mirage (2004)
 Joy of Life (2001)
 Hunter (2000)

References

https://web.archive.org/web/20090103222054/http://www.eastwest-distribution.com/director_ristovski.htm
http://efilmcritic.com/feature.php?feature=1412
Scheck, Frank (19 May 2006). "Mirage review". The Hollywood Reporter. Retrieved in May 2008.
Weitzman, Elizabeth (17 March 2006). ""Movie Digest: Mirage"". New York Daily News. Retrieved in May 2008.

External links

Dear Mr. Gacy official website
2005 Mirage Interview at EFilmCritic

Macedonian film directors
People from Veles, North Macedonia
Living people
1972 births
Ss. Cyril and Methodius University of Skopje alumni
Macedonian artists
Macedonian emigrants to Canada
Canadian people of Macedonian descent